KF Sopoti B is an Albanian football club based in the town of Librazhd. They are currently competing in the Albanian Third Division.

References

Sopoti B